The following is the discography for big band and traditional pop arranger Nelson Riddle (1921–1985).

Albums 
 The Music from Oklahoma! (Capitol, 1955)
 Moonglow (Capitol, 1955)
 Lisbon Antigua (Capitol, 1956)
 The Tender Touch (Capitol, 1956)
 Hey...Let Yourself Go! (Capitol, 1957)
 C'mon...Get Happy! (Capitol, 1957)
 Sea of Dreams (Capitol, 1958)
 The Joy of Living (Capitol, 1959)
 Sing a Song with Riddle (Capitol, 1959)
 Music of the Motion Picture "Can Can" (Capitol, 1960)
 Original Music from the TV Show The Untouchables (Capitol, 1960)
 Dance to the Music of "Tenderloin" (Capitol, 1961)
 Love Tide (Capitol, 1961)
 Magic Moments from "The Gay Life" (Capitol, 1961)
 Route 66 Theme and Other Great TV Hits (Capitol, 1962)
 Love Is a Game of Poker (Capitol, 1962)
 More Hit TV Themes (Capitol, 1963)
 The Best of Nelson Riddle (Capitol, 1963)
 White on White, Shangri-La, Charade & Other Hits of 1964 (Reprise, 1964)
 Original Music from The Rogues (RCA, 1964)
 Interprets Great Music, Great Films, Great Sounds (Reprise, 1964)
 NAT: An Orchestral Portrait of Nat "King" Cole (Reprise, 1966)
 Music for Wives and Lovers (Solid State, 1967)
 The Bright and the Beautiful (Liberty, 1967)
 The Riddle of Today (Liberty, 1968)
 The Contemporary Sound of Nelson Riddle (United Artists, 1968)
 British Columbia Suite (Capilano, 1969)
 The Riddle Touch (Sunset, 1969)
 Nelson Riddle Conducts the 101 Strings (Marble Arch, 1970)
 Communication (MPS, 1972)
 Changing Colors (MPS, 1972)
 Vive Legrand! (Daybreak, 1973)
 The Look of Love (Bulldog, 1982)
 Romance, Fire and Fancy (Intersound, 1983)

With Nat King Cole
 Unforgettable (Capitol, 1954)
 Nat King Cole Sings for Two in Love (Capitol, 1954)
 The Piano Style of Nat King Cole (Capitol, 1955)
 Ballads of the Day (Capitol, 1956)
 This is Nat King Cole (Capitol, 1957)
 St. Louis Blues (Capitol, 1958)
 Cole Español (1958)
 To Whom It May Concern (Capitol, 1959)
 Wild Is Love (Capitol, 1960)
 Nat Cole Sings the Great Songs (Capitol, 1964)

With Ella Fitzgerald
 Ella Fitzgerald Sings the George and Ira Gershwin Songbook (Verve, 1959)
 Ella Swings Gently with Nelson (Verve, 1962)
 Ella Swings Brightly with Nelson (Verve, 1962)
 Ella Fitzgerald Sings the Jerome Kern Songbook (Verve, 1963)
 Ella Fitzgerald Sings the Johnny Mercer Songbook (Verve, 1964)
 Ella Loves Cole
 Dream Dancing  (Atlantic, 1972)
 The Best Is Yet to Come(Pablo, 1982)

With Linda Ronstadt
 What's New?  (Elektra, 1983)
 Lush Life (Elektra, 1984)
 For Sentimental Reasons (Elektra, 1986)

With Frank Sinatra
 Swing Easy (Capitol, 1954)
 Songs for Young Lovers (Capitol, 1954)
 In the Wee Small Hours (Capitol, 1955)
 Songs for Swingin' Lovers (Capitol, 1956)
 This is Sinatra (Capitol, 1956)
 Close to You (Capitol, 1956)
 A Swingin' Affair! (Capitol, 1956)
 This is Sinatra (Volume 2) (Capitol, 1958)
 Frank Sinatra Sings for Only the Lonely (Capitol, 1958)
 Look to Your Heart (Capitol, 1959)
 Nice 'n' Easy (Capitol, 1960)
 Sinatra's Swingin' Session!!! (Capitol, 1960)
 All the Way (Capitol, 1961)
 Sinatra Sings of Love & Things (Capitol, 1962)
 The Concert Sinatra (1963)
 Sinatra's Sinatra (1963)
 Sinatra Sings Days of Wine and Roses, Moon River, and Other Academy Award Winners (Reprise, 1964)
 Strangers in the Night (Reprise, 1966)
 Moonlight Sinatra (Reprise, 1966)

With Keely Smith
 I Wish You Love (Capitol, 1958)
 Swingin' Pretty (Capitol, 1959)
 Little Girl Blue/Little Girl New  (Reprise, 1963)

With others
 Anna Maria Alberghetti, Warm and Willing (Capitol, 1960)
 Shirley Bassey, Let's Face the Music (Columbia, 1962) (released in the U.S. as Shirley Bassey Sings the Hit Song from Oliver!)
 Rosemary Clooney, Rosie Solves the Swingin' Riddle! (RCA Victor, 1961)
 Rosemary Clooney, Love (Reprise, 1962)
 Bing Crosby, Return to Paradise Islands (Reprise, 1964)
 Sammy Davis, Jr., That's Entertainment (MGM, 1974)
 Frank Sinatra, Jr., Spice (Daybreak, 1971)
 Buddy DeFranco, Cross Country Suite (Dot, 1958)
 Eddie Fisher, Games That Lovers Play (RCA, 1966)
 Judy Garland, Judy (1956)
 Judy Garland, Judy in Love (Capitol, 1958)
 Antonio Carlos Jobim, The Wonderful World of Antonio Carlos Jobim (Warner Bros., 1965)
 Jack Jones, There's Love and There's Love and There's Love (Kapp, 1965)
 Kiri Te Kanawa, Blue Skies (London, 1985)
 Steve Lawrence, Portrait of Steve (MGM, 1972)
 Peggy Lee, The Man I Love (Capitol, 1957)
 Peggy Lee, Jump for Joy (Capitol, 1958)
 Dean Martin, This Time I'm Swingin'  (Capitol, 1960)
 Dean Martin, Cha Cha de Amor  (Capitol, 1962)
 Johnny Mathis, I'll Buy You a Star (Capitol, 1962)
 Johnny Mathis, Live it Up (Columbia, 1963)
 Sir Yehudi Menuhin &  Stéphane Grappelli, Top Hat (Angel, 1981)
 Hibari Misora, Hibari in Los-Angels (Nippon Columbia, 1974)
 Oscar Peterson, Oscar Peterson and Nelson Riddle (Verve, 1964)
 Sue Raney, When Your Lover Has Gone (Capitol, 1958)
 Mavis Rivers, Take a Number (Capitol, 1959)
 Tommy Sands, When I'm Thinking of You (Capitol, 1959)
 Tommy Sands, Dream with Me (Capitol, 1960)
 Dinah Shore, Dinah, Yes Indeed! (Capitol, 1959)
 Phil Silvers, Phil Silvers and Swinging Brass (Columbia, 1957)
 Frank Sinatra Jr., His Way (Daybreak, 1972)
 Pinky Tomlin, Country Boy (Arvee, 1963)
 Ed Townsend, New in Town (Capitol, 1959)
 Ed Townsend, Glad to Be Here (Capitol, 1959)
 Slim Whitman, All Time Favorites (1964)
 Danny Williams, Swinging for You (1962)

Selected singles
 "Lisbon Antigua" (US No. 1 - February 1956)
 "Port Au Prince" (US No. 20 - April 1956)
 "Theme from The Proud Ones" (US No. 39 - July 1956)
 "Route 66 Theme" (US No. 30 - June 1962 - AC No. 9, 1962)
 "Naked City Theme" (US No. 130 - October 1962)
 "What's New" (Featuring Linda Ronstadt) (US No. 53 - December 1983 - AC No. 5, 1983)
 "I've Got a Crush On You" (Featuring Linda Ronstadt) (AC No. 7, 1984)
Sources: Billboard Top Pop Singles, Billboard Adult Contemporary Billboard Bubbling Under Singles Books

Arranger for film and television 
 The Rosemary Clooney Show (1956)
 Pal Joey (1957)
 Can-Can (1960)
 Robin and the 7 Hoods (1964)
 Paint Your Wagon (1969)
 On a Clear Day You Can See Forever (1970)
 The Julie Andrews Hour (1973)
 The Carpenters: Music, Music, Music (1980)
 Till There Was You
 A Man and His Music

Composer for film and television 
 Lisbon (1956)
 Li'l Abner (1959)
 The Untouchables (1959 TV)
 Route 66 (1960 TV)
 Naked City (1960 TV)
 Ocean's Eleven (1960)
 Lolita (1962)
 4 for Texas (1963)
 The Rogues (TV series) (1964)
 A Rage to Live (1965)
 Batman (1966 film)
 Batman (1966–68 TV )
 El Dorado (1966)
 How to Succeed in Business Without Really Trying (1967)
 This Is the Life (1971)
 Emergency! (1972)
 The Great Gatsby (1974)

References

External links

Jazz discographies
 
Discographies of American artists